Events from the year 1758 in Sweden

Incumbents
 Monarch – Adolf Frederick

Events

 
 28 September - Battle of Fehrbellin (1758)
 14 October - First issue of Norrköpings Tidningar.

Births

 
 12 February - Claës Fredrik Hornstedt, naturalist  (died 1809)
 
 
 30 August - Jonas Carl Linnerhielm, State Herald of Sweden, artist and writer (died 129) 
 3 December – Marie Louise Marcadet,  opera singer and actress (died 1804) 
 31 December - Sophie Hagman, ballerina and royal mistress (died 1826)

Deaths

 
 29 April - Georg Carl von Döbeln, Lieutenant General and war hero (born 1720) 
 20 May – Henric Benzelius, clergyman (born 1689) 
 
 
 
 26 October - Johan Helmich Roman, musician (born 1) 
 - Katarina Asplund, religious figure (born 1690) 
 - Ulrika Eleonora von Düben, royal favorite (born 1722)

References

 
Years of the 18th century in Sweden
Sweden